The Villain (Cactus Jack in the UK and Australia) is a 1979 American metrocolor Western comedy film directed by Hal Needham and starring Kirk Douglas, Arnold Schwarzenegger, Ann-Margret, Paul Lynde, Foster Brooks, Strother Martin, Ruth Buzzi, Jack Elam, and Mel Tillis. It is a parody of Western films, blended with an homage to Warner Bros.' Wile E. Coyote and the Road Runner cartoons.

Plot
A beautiful woman, "Charming Jones" (Ann-Margret), is being escorted across the west by a naive, slow-witted cowboy, "Handsome Stranger" (Schwarzenegger), after claiming a large sum of money given to her by her father, "Parody Jones" (Martin). However, bad guy "Avery Simpson" (Elam), who delivered Charming the money, decides he wants it for himself. He hires an old outlaw, "Cactus Jack" Slade (Douglas), to rob them when they leave town.

Throughout the trip, Charming makes advances toward Handsome, all of which are met with indifference. Meanwhile, Cactus Jack proceeds to lay trap after trap for the two, all of which backfire. Jack's attempt to enlist the assistance of "Nervous Elk" (Paul Lynde), the chief of a local American Indian tribe, also fails.

Finally, Jack confronts the couple openly, at which point Charming gives up on romancing Handsome and instead kisses Jack, who proceeds to bounce around in red-hot elation (in a manner reminiscent of Daffy Duck's classic "woo-hoo! Woo-hoo!" bounces).

Cast

Production
The film marked Needham’s third feature film as director and reunited him with actor Kirk Douglas. Prior to focusing on directing, Needham was one of Hollywood’s top stuntmen and stunt coordinators and, although he did not receive onscreen credit, Needham worked as a stunt double for Douglas on In Harm’s Way (1965), The War Wagon (1967) and The Way West (1967). Needham described The Villain as a “‘Roadrunner’ cartoon done with live characters”; several of the gags are direct homages to iconic ones from the Chuck Jones cartoons, such as the sequence where Jack paints a hole in the side of a mountain, only for the wagon to drive right through it; another is Jack being crushed by his own boulder trap.

The film was financed independently by producer Engelberg and Rastar Films, a production company founded by producer Ray Stark. Engelberg and Rastar had previously produced Needham’s Smokey and the Bandit in 1977.

Filming
Principal photography began 16 Oct 1978 on location in Monument Valley in Utah. Other filming sites in the state included Magma Mine, Benson, Rio Rico, the Flying V Ranch, and Western set of Old Tucson, outside Tucson, AZ.

Reception

Critical response
The film received mainly negative reviews, criticizing the execution of the slapstick and the satire. Gene Siskel of the Chicago Tribune gave the film one star, as did Walter J. Addiego of the San Francisco Examiner; Siskel described the film as "a direct ripoff of Tex Avery's marvelous Road Runner cartoons", while Addiego wrote that it contained "the sorriest collection of jokes in recent memory […] put together by a group who probably wouldn't make the grade in the Mel Brooks school of infantile humor." 

Also giving the film one star was Kathleen Carroll, who, in the New York Daily News, summarized it as "a hopelessly stupid Western spoof about a hopelessly stupid gunfighter who learns his bad-guy tactics from studying a pulp novel titled "Badmen of the West" and who invariably ends up being outsmarted by his horse." After the film premiered in Los Angeles, the Los Angeles Times reviewer Linda Gross wrote:

Lawsuit
In 1982, Needham sued the producers, claiming his company, Stuntman Inc., “received different treatment” in matters of equal profit participation among the parties of Rastar, Mort Engelberg, and Stuntman, Inc. In addition to asking for $250,000 in damages, Needham requested an audit of the picture’s finances.

Notes

References

External links
 
 
 

1970s American films
1979 comedy films
1970s Western (genre) comedy films
1970s English-language films
American Western (genre) comedy films
Films directed by Hal Needham
Films shot in Utah
Films scored by Bill Justis